A Stimulus for Reason is the first full-length album released by Alpha Galates. It was released on EMI records in 2008. It was produced by Matthew von Wagner, mixed by Joe Barresi, and Mastered by Bob Ludwig.

Track listing 

 "Conformity" – 1:28
 "2 Months In" – 7:57
 "Standing" – 3:47
 "Natio" – 5:08
 "Obitus" – 4:34
 "The Darkest Eyes" – 3:50
 "Passion" – 5:18
 "Stop Programming" – 1:08
 "Love Despair" – 11:25
 "Time Out" – 3:34
 "Subliminal" – 9:00
 "Entropy and Chaos" – 10:44

2008 albums
Alpha Galates albums